Melzar Avery (September 30, 1854 – June 19, 1939) was a Canadian politician.

Born in Junetown, Escott township, Leeds County, Canada West, the son of Isaac and Mary Avery, Avery was educated at the public School of Escott. A lumber merchant, he was a member of the County Council of Frontenac for 14 years. He was first elected to the House of Commons of Canada in a 1902 by-election for the Ontario electoral district of Addington. A Conservative, he was re-elected in 1904 for the electoral district of Frontenac. He was defeated in 1908.

References
 
 The Canadian Parliament; biographical sketches and photo-engravures of the senators and members of the House of Commons of Canada. Being the tenth Parliament, elected November 3, 1904

1854 births
1939 deaths
Conservative Party of Canada (1867–1942) MPs
Members of the House of Commons of Canada from Ontario